Matsie Angelina "Angie" Motshekga (born 19 June 1955) is a South African politician and educator, serving as the Minister of Basic Education since May 2009. She was also appointed as an acting president of the Republic of South Africa on 2 July 2021, as President Cyril Ramaphosa attended the state funeral of Kenneth Kaunda in Zambia. She was previously a Member of the Executive Council in the Gauteng provincial government. Motshekga is a member of the African National Congress. She is a former president of the party's women's league.

Early life and teaching career
Motshekga was born on 19 June 1955 in Soweto, Transvaal Province. She received her primary school education from different schools in Soweto. She matriculated from a boarding school in Matatiele. Motshekga studied at the University of the North, where she obtained a Bachelor of Arts degree in Education. From the University of the Witwatersrand, Motshekga obtained a Bachelor of Educational Science degree and a master's degree.

In 1981, Motshekga was employed as a teacher at Orlando High School. She worked at the school until 1983, when she resigned following her appointment as a lecturer at the Soweto College of Education. Motshekga became a lecturer at the University of the Witwatersrand in 1985. She lectured at the university until 1994.

Political career
During the 1980s, Motshekga was a member of the Soweto Education Crisis Committee that later formed part of the National Education Coordinating Committee. She held membership of the United Democratic Front. She was also a member of the National Education Union of South Africa. Motshekga was active in the Pimville Civic Association.

Motshekga was the National Convenor of Teacher Unity talks that led to the formation of South African Democratic Teachers Union. She was the regional chair of the African National Congress Women's League in the party's former Kyalami region. From 1994 to 1997, she worked as a director in the office of the presidency. She was elected Deputy Provincial Secretary of the ANCWL in 1997.

Gauteng provincial government
After the 1999 general election, Motshekga was sworn in as a member of the Gauteng Provincial Legislature. She was named the chairperson of the legislature's education committee. In 2000, premier Mbhazima Shilowa appointed her to the Social Development portfolio of the Executive Council. After the 2004 general election, Motshekga returned to the legislature for her second term. Shilowa moved her to the Education portfolio.

Motshekga was elected the national president of the ANC women's league in 2008, defeating the league's secretary-general Bathabile Dlamini. She received 1,826 votes.

National government
Motshekga was elected to the National Assembly in April 2009. Newly elected president Jacob Zuma unbundled the Education portfolio into two new, separate ministries. Motshekga was appointed Minister of Basic Education. She took office on 11 May 2009. During her first term, textbooks were not delivered to impoverished Limpopo schools between December 2011 and June 2012. She faced calls to resign or be removed, but she remained in the position.

Following the 2014 general election, Zuma retained Motshekga in her position. Bathabile Dlamini unseated her as women's league president in August 2015. In 2017, she ran for ANC national president under the women's league banner without asking for permission. The league criticised Motshekga and later endorsed Nkosazana Dlamini-Zuma for the ANC presidency.

Zuma resigned as South African president in February 2018 and deputy president Cyril Ramaphosa was designated as his successor. Ramaphosa kept Motshekga in her position. In 2019, she became the longest-serving education minister in South African history. She was re-elected as an MP in that year's general election. She remained as minister of basic education.

On 15 February 2021, Motshekga said to pupils at Prospectus High School in Pretoria that an "educated man won't rape". Her comment caused outrage. She responded by saying that her comment was taken out of context.

In 2014 Motshekga claimed that the standard of question papers had increased after an English exam paper riddled with basic spelling and grammar errors was given to learners.  In 2022 a mathematics examination paper included a problem that was unsolvable due to a typing error.  The error was not picked up before the paper was given and Motshekga's department will decide whether an upward mark adjustment of 1% or 2% is necessary.

Personal life
Motshekga is married to former Premier of Gauteng and former ANC chief whip, Mathole Motshekga. They have children and grandchildren.

References

External links

Living people
Members of the National Assembly of South Africa
Government ministers of South Africa
Education ministers of South Africa
Women government ministers of South Africa
University of the Witwatersrand alumni
1955 births
Women members of the National Assembly of South Africa
21st-century South African politicians
21st-century South African women politicians